This is a list of members of the Australian Senate from 1959 to 1962. Half of its members were elected at the 10 December 1955 election and had terms starting on 1 July 1956 and finishing on 30 June 1962; the other half were elected at the 22 November 1958 election and had terms starting on 1 July 1959 and finishing on 30 June 1965. The process for filling casual vacancies was complex. While senators were elected for a six-year term, people appointed to a casual vacancy only held office until the earlier of the next election for the House of Representatives or the Senate.

Notes

References

Members of Australian parliaments by term
20th-century Australian politicians
Australian Senate lists